"My Boy" is a popular song from the early 1970s. The music was composed by Jean-Pierre Bourtayre and Claude François, and the lyrics were translated from the original version "Parce que je t'aime, mon enfant" (Because I Love You My Child) into English by Phil Coulter and Bill Martin.

Song meaning
A sentimental ballad, the song is sung in a first-person narrative from the point of view of a father to his young son under the presumption that the child is asleep and cannot hear what his father is trying to tell him.  The father tells his son of the truth of the strained relationship between the child's parents, and that all the father has left is the love of his son.  Rather than risk losing that through a painful divorce, the father makes the decision to stay in a loveless marriage for the sake of his child.

Richard Harris version
Actor Richard Harris performed the song "My Boy" at a music contest sponsored by Radio Luxembourg in 1971. Despite not winning the contest, Harris recorded the song and released it as a single later that year. Appearing on Harris' album of the same name, the song reached #41 on the Billboard pop chart and peaked at #13 on the Billboard adult contemporary chart.

Elvis Presley version
Elvis Presley recorded a cover version of "My Boy" in late 1973 that was included on his 1974 album Good Times. Presley's version of the song reached #20 on the Billboard pop chart and #17 on Cash Box. In the UK, where Presley's career had had something of a resurgence in the previous few years, it made the top 10 peaking at number 5 in the first week of January 1975. It was a bigger adult contemporary hit, spending one week atop the U.S. and Canadian charts in April 1975. "My Boy also peaked at #14 on the Billboard country chart.

Charts

Richard Harris version

Elvis Presley version

Year-end charts

See also
List of number-one adult contemporary singles of 1975 (U.S.)

References

External links 
 

1971 singles
1974 singles
1975 singles
Richard Harris songs
Elvis Presley songs
Songs written by Bill Martin (songwriter)
Songs written by Phil Coulter
Songs with music by Claude François
Songs written by Jean-Pierre Bourtayre
1971 songs
Pop ballads
RCA Records singles
Songs about fathers
Songs about children